Beştepe may refer to:

 Beştepe, a neighbourhood in Yenimahalle, Ankara, Turkey.
 Beștepe, a commune in Tulcea County, Romania.